Malekiyeh-ye Vosta (also Romanized as Mālekīyeh-ye Vosţà; also known as Mālekīyeh and Mālekīyeh-ye Gharbī) is a village in Howmeh-ye Sharqi Rural District, in the Central District of Dasht-e Azadegan County, Khuzestan Province, Iran. At the 2006 census, its population was 567, in 104 families.

References 

Populated places in Dasht-e Azadegan County